Alexandre Castellino (born 6 January 1881, date of death unknown) was a Swiss racing cyclist. He was the Swiss National Road Race champion in 1904.

References

External links

1881 births
Year of death missing
Swiss male cyclists
Cyclists from Geneva